Channing Wilroy (born November 8, 1940)
is an American film actor who has appeared in seven films by John Waters. His first film role was the character Channing, the manservant in the film Pink Flamingos. Because of his work with Waters, Wilroy is considered one of the Dreamlanders, Waters' ensemble of regular cast and crew members.

Prior to appearing in the films of John Waters, he was a regular on The Buddy Deane Show for three years.

He lives in Provincetown, Massachusetts and runs an inn.

Filmography
Pink Flamingos (1972) as Channing the Butler
Female Trouble (1974) as Prosecuting Lawyer
Desperate Living (1977) as Lieutenant Wilson
Pecker (1998) as Wiseguy neighbor
Divine Trash (1998) (himself)
Cecil B. DeMented (2000) as Shop steward
In Bad Taste (2000) (TV) (himself)
A Dirty Shame (2004) as Irate motorist
All the Dirt on 'A Dirty Shame''' (2005) (Himself)

OtherThe Buddy Deane Show (1957) (TV series)Cry-Baby'' (1990) (music consultant)

References

External links

Living people
American male film actors
1940 births